American Landscape is an album by the American pianist David Benoit. It was released in 1997 via the GRP label. The album reached No. 7 on Billboard's Jazz chart.

Critical reception
AllMusic noted that "the energetic closer 'Speed Racer' builds from a soft orchestral intro into a full-on Western horse race between Benoit and banjo virtuoso Béla Fleck, then combines a jazz trio with a dramatic orchestral underscore."

Track listing
All tracks written and composed by David Benoit.
"American Landscape" - 4:23
"Max's Boogie" - 4:23
"Lost in Tokyo" - 3:35
"If I Can Believe" - 6:23
"A Personal Story" - 4:54
"Rue de la Soleil" - 4:24
"Saying Goodbye" - 4:53
"Mr. Rodriguez's Opus" - 4:54
"Speed Racer" - 5:51

Personnel 
 David Benoit – acoustic piano (1-9), arrangements (1-4, 6, 7), orchestra arrangements and conductor (1, 4, 5, 8, 9)
 Pat Kelley – fretted instruments (1, 4, 5, 8, 9)
 Béla Fleck – banjo (1, 9)
 Dean Parks – guitar (2, 3, 6, 7)
 Nathan East – bass (1, 4, 5, 8, 9)
 Ken Wild – bass (2, 3, 6, 7)
 John Robinson – drums (1, 4, 5, 8, 9)
 Carlos Vega – drums (2, 3, 6, 7)
 Luis Conte – percussion (1-9)
 Poncho Sanchez – congas (8)
 Tommy Morgan – harmonica (1, 9)
 Eric Marienthal – alto saxophone (1-9), soprano saxophone (1-9)
 Jerry Hey – trumpet (8)
 David Blumberg – arrangements (5, 8, 9)
 The London Symphony Orchestra – orchestra (1, 4, 5, 8, 9)

Production 
 Producers – David Benoit and Al Schmitt 
 Executive Producer – Tommy LiPuma 
 Engineers – Al Schmitt and Bill Smith
 Second Engineers – David Nottingham, Luis Rodriguez and Toby Woods.
 Mixing – Al Schmitt
 Mastered by Doug Sax at The Mastering Lab (Hollywood, CA).
 Music Preparation – Ken Gruberman at Quill Music Services.
 Project Coordinator – Dianna Mich Newell
 Art Direction – Hollis King 
 Graphic Design – Kevin Gaor
 Illustration – Will Klemm
 Photography – Tracy Lamonica
 Liner Notes – Sally Field
 Management – Fitzgerald Hartley Co.

Charts

References

External links
David Benoit-American Landscape at Discogs

1997 albums
David Benoit (musician) albums
albums produced by Al Schmitt
GRP Records albums